Aage Rubæk-Nielsen (25 August 1913 – 20 May 1990) was a Danish equestrian. He competed in two events at the 1952 Summer Olympics.

References

External links
 

1913 births
1990 deaths
Danish male equestrians
Olympic equestrians of Denmark
Equestrians at the 1952 Summer Olympics